Touch and Go (also published as "Press Ups") is a board game published by Invicta Games in 1974.

Gameplay
Touch and Go is an abstract strategy game.

Reviews
Games & Puzzles #43
Jeux & Stratégie #6

References

External links
 

Board games introduced in 1974